Billy Rayner (22 May 1935 – 18 July 2006) was an Australian rugby league footballer who played in the 1950s and 1960s.

Career
Originally from Yass, New South Wales, Billy Rayner went on to play 195 games for Parramatta during a long 11-year career between 1956 and 1966.  Rayner's playing career with Parramatta was during a very difficult period in the club's history where they struggled on the field for many years due to having limited resources and a weak playing roster.  Rayner collected 6 wooden spoons in his career at Parramatta.

He also represented both New South Wales and Australia on two occasions each in 1960. He is listed on the Australian Players Register as Kangaroo No. 360. His usual position was as at hooker. He later went on to be a director of the Parramatta Eels's club.
In 1967, Rayner was made a life member of the Parramatta club.

In 1995 Rayner was awarded life membership of the New South Wales Rugby League.  In 2004, Rayner was inducted into the Parramatta clubs Hall of Fame. He died after a short illness in July 2006, aged 71.

References

1935 births
2006 deaths
Australia national rugby league team players
Australian rugby league players
Parramatta Eels players
Rugby league hookers
Rugby league players from Yass, New South Wales